Calade is  a French term for a harmonious, decorative and useful arrangement of medium-sized pebbles, fixed to the ground.

Rue en calade describes a road with a surface composed in this way—essentially a cobblestone road.  These are found predominantly in the French region of Provence, and generally in the Mediterranean area.

The corresponding term in Italian is risseu, which is not Italian but Ligurian.

Types of roads